Mechnikovo is a rural locality (a selo) in Nizhneavryuzovsky Selsoviet, Alsheyevsky District, Bashkortostan, Russia. The population was 435 as of 2010. There are 8 streets.

Geography 
Mechnikovo is located 26 km south of Rayevsky (the district's administrative centre) by road. Nizhneye Avryuzovo is the nearest rural locality.

References 

Rural localities in Alsheyevsky District